Tom Clerc is a fictional deaf superhero appearing in Sign Gene: The First Deaf Superheroes, the world's first film about deaf superheroes. Tom is Italian American and comes from a long lineage of deaf families ranging back to the 1800 and is descendant from Laurent Clerc, French deaf teacher that established the first deaf school in the United States, along with Thomas Gallaudet. For the first time deaf people were able to get together and therefore gave birth to American Sign Language, thus, Laurent Clerc is also known as the “Father of American Sign Language”.

Fictional character biography
Tom Clerc was born in Rome. When he was one year old, her mother Giulia Clerc, being chased by villains who wanted to have her entire family killed, decided to hide him somewhere around the ancient city of Rome and disappeared. Since then, Tom grew up in an orphanage. Ten years passed when Tom's grandmother Linda Clerc found him at the orphanage. Upon checking Tom's scar on his index finger, a genetic trait typical of mutants carrier of the powerful Sign Gene mutation known as SGx29, Linda confirmed that the ten years old kid was her nephew and took him to her mansion. After spending some time with his grandmother, Tom was sent to New York City to attend the New York Sign Gene Mutants School, one of the few existing schools for students carriers of the Sign Gene mutation, under her expenses. It was there when he first met Kate Massieu, herself descendant of Jean Massieu pioneering deaf educator, that would later become his girlfriend.

Agency
Tom works at the Q.I.A., QuinPar Intelligence Agency, a secret agency based in New York City where all agents are carriers of the Sign Gene mutation and is run by Hugh Denison.

Villains
Tom's main villain is his own brother, Jux Clerc, the leader of the 1.8.8.0 (International Genetic Genealogy Organization) an evil organization dedicated to exterminating Sign Gene mutants. The 1.8.8.0 is based in Milan and refers to the Milan Conference in 1880 where educators declared that ‘sound languages’ were superior to ‘visual languages’ and passed a resolution banning the use of sign language in schools. During a fierce fight with Jux, Tom had lost a great part of his superpowers.

When Tom was sent to Japan by the Q.I.A. to investigate a spate of crimes that seem to have connections to gene mutations, he met Tatsumi Fuwa, the boss of a Japanese gang, himself mutant as well that would later become one of his main villains as well.

Power and abilities
Tom is carrier of SGx29, a type of Sign Gene mutation. His superpowers are certain actions, and the actions take place through the use of sign language. His main and iconic power is smoking with the sign for cigarette: he would sign it, so with one hand on his mouth looking like it's a cigarette, with his other hand shaped, using the sign for lighter, and he would motion for the hand with the lighter in it to light the cigarette. It actually provides a flame so that  he is able to light the cigarette in actual life. The other superpower is the hand shape for gun, which manifests in the actual capability of shooting bullets. So the bullets shoot out of the hand shape that's used in sign language for the gun.

Reception
Michael Rechtshaffen of the Los Angeles Times, described the movie Sign Gene: The First Deaf Superheroes as one with a, "fresh, unique filmmaking voice" and a “fast-paced potpourri of stock footage combined with sign-language and stroboscopic action sequences performed by a deaf cast, video effects simulating grainy, scratchy film stock and that aforementioned all-enveloping sound mix, with an end result that proves as wildly inventive as it is empowering."

References

External links
 
 

Fictional characters from Rome
Fictional deaf characters
Fictional mutants
Fictional immigrants to the United States
Fictional Italian American people
Film characters introduced in 2017
Male characters in film
Orphan characters in film